Isabelle Kridluar (born 1954) is an Inuit artist.

Her work is included in the collections of the National Gallery of Canada and the Musée national des beaux-arts du Québec.

References

1954 births
20th-century Canadian artists
20th-century Canadian women artists
21st-century Canadian artists
21st-century Canadian women artists
Inuit artists
Living people